John T. Harvey (born January 20, 1961) is an English-American professor of economics at Texas Christian University. Harvey, a post-Keynesian economist, which is considered a type of heterodox economics, publishes accessible editorials and content to the field's study.

Early life and education 

Born in London, England, Harvey attended Knoxville Catholic High School, in Tennessee, in 1979. He completed his undergraduate studies at the neighboring University of Tennessee in a double-major program of economics and political science in 1983. Over the next four years, Harvey finished his graduate work at the same university, acquiring his master's degree and doctorate in economics in 1986 and 1987, respectively.

Professional life 

Texas Christian University hired Harvey from the University of Tennessee once he completed his doctorate in 1987. He later became chair of the Department of Economics. His areas of specialty include the history of economics, macroeconomics, and its various contemporary schools of thought.

While serving two professional organizations, Harvey has been a contributor to the economic reports of Forbes since April 2011.

Personal life 
During his graduate years, he married Melanie Lynn Barker on August 3, 1985 in Nashville. They have twin daughters, Megan Anna and Alexandra Morgan, who were born on June 4, 1994 in Fort Worth, Texas. The family owns a pet dog, Rommel.

Harvey's leisure activities are playing computer games or reading about the Second World War.

References 

1961 births
Texas Christian University faculty
Living people
21st-century American economists